Biebrich may refer to:

Biebrich (Wiesbaden), a borough of Wiesbaden, Hesse, Germany, until 1926 an independent town
 Biebrich Palace, Wiesbaden
Biebrich, Rhineland Palatinate, a small municipality in the Rhein-Lahn district, Rhineland-Palatinate, Germany